The Pigskin Club of Washington, D.C., Inc. was founded in 1938 with the goals of "improving relationship between persons interested in the game of football; that there may be given encouragement for good, clean sport; that there may be a more perfect understanding among such persons; and, that there may be mutual benefits and pleasures derived from such association."

History
Formal organization took place on the evening of Friday, October 7, 1938, at the 12th Street Branch YWCA. Officers elected were: President, Charles B. Fisher;  Vice Presidents, Edwin B. Henderson and John R. Pinkett;  Secretary George E. Brice  and Treasurer, William H. Greene.  There were 52 original Charter Members. By the time the organization held its Thirtieth Anniversary Awards Dinner membership had grown to over 500 representative leaders in civic, professional, religious, educational and community action areas of interest in the District of Columbia and ten Atlantic Seaboard States, men primarily concerned with stimulating clean, fair play and DEMOCRACY IN SPORTS at the high school, college and professional level of competition.

The Black Tie, 30th Anniversary Awards Dinner was held on December 9, 1967, at the D.C. Statler-Hilton.  Special honored guests that night were; Vice President, Hubert H. Humphrey, Senators, Birch Bayh of Indiana, Edward Brooke of Massachusetts and Edward Kennedy of Massachusetts.  Major National Intercollegiate Trophy Winners that night were Leroy Keyes,  Purdue University;  Granville Liggins,  University of Oklahoma;  Daryl Johnson,  Morgan State University;  and  John Pont, Indiana University.

Honorees
During the previous 29 years the Pigskin Club had honored the following National Intercollegiate All-American Football Players:

Dick Bass, College of the Pacific
Emerson Boozer, Maryland State
Jim Brown, Syracuse University
Robert Brown, University of Nebraska
Bill Burrell, University of Illinois
Ron Burton, Northwestern University
Reggie Bush, USC
Dick Butkus, University of Illinois
Al Calcavanti, Bucknell University
Howard Cassady, Ohio State University
Gary Collins, University of Maryland
Frank Cornish Jr., Grambling State University
Ernie Davis, Syracuse University
Oliver Dobbins, Morgan State University
Earl Faison, Indiana University
Bob Ferguson, Ohio State University
Mike Garrett, University of Southern California
Harry Harmon, University of Pittsburgh
Kevin Hardy, Notre Dame
Jerome Holland, Cornell University
John Huarte, University of Notre Dame
Rafer Johnson, UCLA
Calvin Jones, University of Iowa
Clinton Jones, Michigan State
Walt Kowalczyk, Michigan State University
Willie Lanier, Morgan State University
Floyd Little, Syracuse University
Tom McLuckie, University of Maryland
Jim Marshall, Ohio State University
Ollie Matson, University of San Francisco
Bobby Mitchell, University of Illinois
Lenny Moore, Pennsylvania State University
Jim Nance, Syracuse University
Mel Renfro, University of Oregon
Pat Richter, University of Wisconsin
Jackie Robinson, UCLA
Johnny Sample, Maryland State College
Duke Slater, University of Iowa
Roger Staubach, United States Naval Academy
Sandy Stephens, University of Minnesota
Ralph Tyler, Livingstone University
J. T. Williams, Oklahoma A&M
Buddy Young, University Of Illinois
Henry Young, Alabama A&M

The National Intercollegiate Football Coaches and Athletic Directors Honored were;

Milt Bruhn, University of Wisconsin
Hugh Daugherty, Michigan State
Robert Devaney, University of Nebraska
Clyde Engle, Penn State
Forest Evashevski, University of Iowa
Jake Gaither, Florida A&M
Woody Hayes, Ohio State
Eddie Jackson, Delaware State
Eddie Hurt, Morgan State
Vernon McCain, Maryland State
Bill Nicks, Prairie View
Ara Parseghian, Notre Dame
Bert Piggot, North Carolina A&T
Ben Schwartzwalder, Syracuse University
Edward Robinson, Grambling University
Jim Tatum, University of Maryland
Brutus Wilson, Shaw University

The Pigskin Club has also honored Major League Baseball's Willie Mays and Maury Wills.

References

External links
 

American football in Washington, D.C.
1938 establishments in Washington, D.C.